Ibrahim Mughrabi (born 1939 in Aleppo) was a Syrian footballer of Palestinian descent who played as a striker. He was the first foreigner to ever play in the Greek Championship. In Greece he was known as "Ibrahim".

Club career
Mughrabi studied Law at the Damascus University while playing football for Halab Al-Ahli. Hailing from a noble family, he played football mostly for fun. He moved to Athens in 1962 in order to continue his studies at the University of Athens. He signed for AEK Athens, becoming the first ever foreign player to play for a greek club. At his debut, on 27 September 1962 against Egaleo, he introduced himself to the fans of the double-headed eagle by scoring a hat-trick, in a 7–2 win. On 7 October, he opened the score with a header in the 4–0 home win against Ethnikos He scored against Aris on 21 October, opening the score in the final 3–1 at home. On 28 April 1963, he scored in the 3–0 home win over Panionios. He shaped the last of the 5 goals of his club in the 5–1 against PAOK at home, on 5 May. His last 2 goals for AEK were on 19 May 1963 in a match for the Greek Cup at home against Kalamata, where he formed the final 7–1. In his only season at AEK he won the Greek Championship. In the summer of 1963 he returned to Syria.

International career
In 1965 he played with Palestine in the 4th Pan-Arab Games held in Egypt, winning the fourth place. He scored the winner in the match against Lebanon.

Honours

AEK Athens
Alpha Ethniki: 1962–63

References

External links
 Foreign Players in Greece since 1959/60 rsssf.org
Ibrahim_Mughrabi at Wiki.phantis.com
Ο άγνωστος Παλαιστίνιος πρώτος ξένος στην ιστορία της ΑΕΚ! gazzetta.gr

1939 births
Living people
Sportspeople from Aleppo
Syrian footballers
Association football forwards
AEK Athens F.C. players
Al-Ittihad Aleppo players
Super League Greece players
Expatriate footballers in Greece
Syrian expatriate footballers
Syrian Premier League players